Dorfarje is a village in the Municipality of Škofja Loka in the Upper Carniola region of Slovenia.

Name
The name Dorfarje was first attested in 1291 as in Dorfern. It is derived from Middle High German Dorfern, originally a plural form of the common noun dorfære 'villager' (< dorf 'village'). The name therefore literally means 'villagers' and refers to early German colonization of the Sora Plain. In the past the German name was Dörfern.

References

External links 

Dorfarje at Geopedia

Populated places in the Municipality of Škofja Loka